Xiahou Lingnü (夏侯令女) was a Chinese noblewoman, member of the aristocrat Xiahou clan during the Three Kingdoms period. Alongside her family, she served her entire life the state of Cao Wei, a major faction in Three Kingdoms era. She is best known for her role in events before the Incident at the Gaoping Tombs; she remained loyal to the Cao Wei and protested her family's wishes to remarry and joins Sima Yi's coup d'état against Cao Shuang, cutting off one of her facial organs each time she was asked. Her actions were admired by her potential rival, Sima Yi, who gave her the role to continue the legacy of the Cao lineage.

The most notable information about her comes from Huangfu Mi's Biographies of Exemplary Women (Lienü Zhuan), which was supposed to be an instructional text for confucian women. Due to her heroic act of remaining loyal to the Cao family even when them was in disgrace, she was immortalized as one of the most memorable acts of loyalty performed by a woman in Chinese history.

Genealogy and arrival to the Cao family 
Xiahou Lingnü nasceu como filha de Xiahou Wenning. Entre seus parentes estão os generais famosos. Xiahou Dun • e Xiahou Yuan, que serviram Cao Cao o fundador do estado de Cao Wei. Outros possíveis parentes dela são; Lady Xiahou, que se casou Zhang Fei • De Shu Han • estado; Xiahou Ba, um general Cao Wei que desertou para o Estado de Shu logo após o Expedições do Norte de Jiang Wei; e Xiahou Hui, membro da família Cao e esposa de Sima Shi (filho de Sima Yi), sua morte poderia ter iniciado tensões entre o clã Sima e o clã Cao. As filhas de Senhora Xiahou (esposa de Zhang Fei e sobrinha de Xiahou Yuan), Imperatriz Jing'ai e Imperatriz Zhang tornaram-se imperatrizes do estado de Shu Han, fazendo com que o clã Xiahou se dividisse entre as duas facções.

Lingnu entered a political marriage with the regent Cao Shuang's cousin Cao Wenshu (曹文叔), making her an upper class aristocrat. During the marriage she had no children.

Incident at Gaoping Tombs 
Shortly before a coup d'état against Cao Shuang began, Xiahou Lingnü's husband died. Due to the growing contention against the members of the Cao clan and the growing popularity of the Sima clan, Lingnu's father joined the traitorous forces against Cao Wei.

In order to sever ties with Cao Wei, Xiahou Wenning decided to marry Lingnu into a new family. So great was her desire to preserve her honor and her allegiance to the Cao family that she cut her hair and ears as a sign of refusal.

In 5 February 249, Cao Shuang and his two brothers, Cao Xi (曹羲) and Cao Xun, left the imperial capital Luoyang to accompany the emperor Cao Fang to pay respects to his ancestors at the Gaoping Tombs (高平陵). After that, they proceeded to go on a hunting expedition outside Luoyang. Sima Yi, a famous general who Lingnu's father admire, seized the opportunity to launch a coup d'état and take command of the military forces stationed in Luoyang.

When Sima Yi took control of the capital city of Luoyang and issuing a memorial which listed out the various crimes Cao Shuang had committed. Cao Shuang surrendered and gave up his powers after further receiving reassurance that he and his family would be spared. After this, Sima Yi then went to see Empress Dowager Guo and coerce her into issuing an imperial order for the arrest of Cao Shuang and his brothers under charges of treason. In 9 February, Cao Shuang, his brothers, and his supporters were charged with treason and executed along with their families.

After Cao Shuang's death, Xiahou Lingnü cut her nose in response to her family's request to sever ties with the disgraced Cao clan. Aghast at her actions, they said, "Our life in this world is like a particle of light dust on a blade of weak grass. Why torment yourself to this extent? Besides, your husband’s family is completely exterminated. What purpose does it serve for you to persevere in your chastity?".

Insulting her family's cowardly act, Lingnu replied:"I have heard that a person of worth does not renounce his principles because of changes in fortune, nor a righteous person change his mind with a view to preservation or destruction. While the Cao flourished, I was bent on keeping my chastity. Now that they have declined and perished, can I bear to renounce them? Even animals do not act this way; how can I?" When Sima Yi heard of Lingnu's heroic action, he praised her loyalty and allowed her to adopt a son, relative to Cao Shuang, to continue the Cao lineage. The coup d'état increased the Sima family's influence and paved the way for the eventual replacement of the Cao Wei regime by the Sima family's Jin dynasty in 266.

Xiahou Lingnü continued in the domain of the Sima clan, she raised a son who was directly related to Cao Cao. With this child, she was charged with continuing the legacy of the Cao family.

See also 
Zhao E, another woman from the Three Kingdoms who was inserted in the Hungfu Mi's Biographies of Exemplary Women.

References

Sources 

 

People of Cao Wei